The 1976 Suisse Open Gstaad was a men's tennis tournament played on outdoor clay courts in Gstaad, Switzerland. It was the 31st edition of the tournament and was held from 4 July through 11 July 1976. The tournament was part of the Grand Prix tennis circuit. Raúl Ramírez won the singles title.

Finals

Singles
 Raúl Ramírez defeated  Adriano Panatta 7–5, 6–7, 6–1, 6–3
 It was Ramírez 3rd singles title of the year and the 10th of his career.

Doubles
 Jürgen Fassbender /  Hans-Jürgen Pohmann defeated  Paolo Bertolucci /  Adriano Panatta 7–5, 6–3, 6–3

References

External links
 Official website
 Association of Tennis Professionals (ATP) – Tournament profile
 International Tennis Federation (ITF) – Tournament details

Swiss Open (tennis)
Swiss Open Gstaad
Swiss Open Gstaad
Swiss Open Gstaad